Frigg gas field is a natural gas field on Norwegian block 25/1 in the North Sea, on the boundary between the United Kingdom and Norway. The field is named after the goddess Frigg. King Olav V of Norway officially opened production on 8 May 1978. Production was closed on 26 October 2004. Operator for the field was the French oil company Elf Aquitaine, which merged and changed name to Total S.A.

Operations were regulated according to an agreement between the UK and Norwegian governments called the Frigg Treaty.

Infrastructural changes were made in three phases:
 Phase I - 1977
 Phase II - 1978
 Phase III - 1981

Geology
The well was located following interpretation of a 15 by 20 km grid of Reflection seismology lines recorded in 1965. The fan structure appears on seismic sections as a low relief Anticline that includes a Flat spot caused by the Density contrast of the gas.

Development 
The Frigg field has been developed through a number of offshore platforms.

The initial production of gas (in 1000 standard cubic metres) was:

Pipelines 

Pipelines associated with the Frigg field are as follows:

Pipelines connected to the Frigg field
 Frigg UK System - natural gas transportation system from the Alwyn North Field in the North Sea via the Frigg field to St. Fergus near Peterhead in Scotland. The Frigg UK System is operated by Total E&P UK Plc.
 Vesterled - mostly the former Frigg Norwegian Pipeline

Images

Future plans
The Frigg field may be revitalised. A production licence on the Norwegian side of Frigg was allocated to Equinor in 2016. An appraisal well was drilled on Frigg in 2019. Equinor also holds the licence rights on the UK side of the field.

References

Bibliography

External links

 Frigg Industrial Heritage - a website by the Norwegian Petroleum Museum, English version
 Frigg decommissioning - at the website of Total E&P Norge
 Frigg UK: 30 Years on
 Frigg in Interactive Energy Map

Natural gas fields in Norway
North Sea energy
TotalEnergies